The World Figure Skating Championships is an annual event sanctioned by the International Skating Union in which figure skaters compete for the title of World Champion.

The competition took place on February 5–6 in Stockholm, Sweden. These were the last figure skating world championships with only the men's category.

Results

Judges:
 E. Hörle 
 M. Rendschmidt 
 E. v. Markus 
 O. Petterson 
 Herbert R. Yglesias 
 Rudolf Sundgren 
 Ivar Westergren

Sources
 Result List provided by the ISU

World Figure Skating Championships
World Figure Skating Championships, 1905
Figure skating in Sweden
International figure skating competitions hosted by Sweden
1900s in Stockholm
1905 in Sweden
February 1905 sports events
International sports competitions in Stockholm